Air Vice Marshal Farooq Umar is a veteran Pakistani fighter pilot who is known for twice breaking the sound barrier over the Amritsar Air Force Station in his Lockheed F-104 during the 1965 War.

Early life 
Farooq was born at Lyallpur, Punjab, in British India in 1941. His father Mian Muhammad Nurullah was the first finance minister of Punjab in the 1947/48 Mandate cabinet.

Personal life 
Farooq Umar was married to Seemeen Farooq from Quetta. They had four children: Syma Farooq, Shehma Farooq, Salaar Farooq and Sonia Farooq, and eight grandchildren: Ahad Farooq, Asad Farooq, Shanze Farooq, Shahmeer Farooq, Shireen Farooq, Anya Ali, Alize Ali and Mariah Farooq.

Education 

He was schooled at the Burn Hall, Abbottabad, the Central Model School and the Government College in Lahore. He graduated with a B.Sc. Karachi University in 1976, an M.Sc. in War Studies from the Quaid-e-Azam University in 1978, and a Ph.D. in International Relations from the Royal College of Defence Studies (RCDS) London in 1983.

While at RCDS, in 1982, he gave a presentation to the Queen Elizabeth II and the Prime Minister Margaret Thatcher, regarding “Pakistan’s Importance for NATO” and the need for Pakistan to rejoin the British Commonwealth".

Career

Service with the Air Force 
Farooq joined the Pakistan Air Force in 1958 and graduated as a fighter pilot from the Risalpur Academy in 1960, winning Triple honours i.e., the Sword of Honour, the Best Pilot's Trophy and the Academics Trophy. He subsequently won the Jet Conversion Trophy in 1961 and the “Top Gun” award as well as the Roll of Honour from the Fighter leader School in 1971. In 1962, he was posted to the PAF's elite No. 9 Squadron "Griffins" flying the F-104 Starfighters.

He taught at the National Defence College (War Wing) and was the air defence sector commander for Sindh and Baluchistan, Base Commander Lahore, Commandant PAF Staff College Faisal Karachi, Base commander Faisal Air Base Karachi, and Director General Pakistan Aeronautical Complex, Kamra.

He has been decorated 12 times by the Government of Pakistan, out of which three times he has been Decorated for Courage and Bravery in Combat (Gallantry Award of Sitara-e-Jurrat, Sitara-e-Basalat and Tamgaha-e-Basalat).

Operation Desert Hawk 

During the Rann of Kutch conflict, Farooq flew various sorties and also participated in the Battle of Biar Bet during which he assisted the 24th Cavalry's fight against Indian forces.

1965 Indo-Pakistani War 
During rise in hostilities with India over the Indian administered Kashmir, Farooq's Squadron was deployed at PAF Base Sargodha from where they saw combat. On 1 September 1965, the PAF's Commander in Chief, "Nur Khan" ordered then Flight Lieutenant Farooq Umer to perform a low level sonic boom over the IAF airbase at Amritsar. Farooq did as he was told and took off in his Mach 2 capable Lockheed F-104A Starfighter. As he crossed the international border, he went supersonic and performed a sonic boom over the Indian Air Force's Amritsar Air Force Station. Farooq then reached out to Nur Khan over the radio and informed him about the mission's status to which Nur Khan ordered him to perform another sonic boom over the same Base. Farooq did as he was told but this time the Indians started firing their Anti-Aircraft guns, though the high speeds kept his aircraft safe and he successfully performed the second sonic boom, Farooq was ordered to return to base. Upon reaching back at Sargodha, Farooq learnt that his sonic booms had caught the Indians completely off guard to such extent that the All India radio was reported to have narrated about the Amritsar Air Base being attacked and rocketed/bombed by 8 Pakistani F-86 Sabres.

1971 Indo Pakistani War 
During the 1971 war, Farooq was serving as a Squadron Leader in the PAF's No. 5 Squadron "eagles" flying Dassault Mirage-3EP strike fighters. He participated in the Operation Chengiz Khan. On 5 December 1971, Farooq shot down two IAF Hawker Hunters over Lyallpur, Punjab.

1973 Arab-Israeli War 
During the Yom Kippur War, Farooq was amongst several Pakistan Air Force 'volunteers' deployed to various Arab countries in the Middle East to serve as military advisors. Farooq performed air defence operations during the conflict.

Ministry of Defence Service 
After thirty-five years in the air force, he was assigned to the Government of Pakistan and was asked to setup Shaheen Air. He was then made the CEO and Managing Director of the Pakistan International Airlines (PIAC) and given Grade-M1 (equivalent to three-stars).

Other Services 
Farooq served as the President of the Pakistan Hockey Federation from 1993–96. Until he was the elected President of Majlis-e-Quaid-e-Azam, President AFOS (Falcon Enclave), Vice President PAFROA Punjab and Patron in Chief Al-Shaoor Welfare Association (All Honorary).

Literary Work 
Farooq also presides the "AVM Farooq Foundation" which provides inspirational material to the youth and general public. For this, he wrote a book "Learn The Secrets of Success" containing the rules of Self Motivation and determination to achieve goals. The first edition of the book was published in September 2013 followed by the second edition in November 2013. The preface of the book was written by Muhammad Mahmood Alam, a war veteran and Flying ace of the 1965 War.

See also 

 Mervyn Middlecoat
 Asghar Khan

References

Further reading 
http://www.avmfarooqumar.com/
https://web.archive.org/web/20120307125349/http://www.avmfarooqumar.com/interview01.html
https://archive.today/20140726165549/http://pk.linkedin.com/pub/avm-farooq-umar/1b/829/763
http://www.facebook.com/avmfarooq.umar

Living people
Pakistan Air Force officers
University of Karachi alumni
People from Faisalabad
Recipients of Sitara-e-Jurat
Quaid-i-Azam University alumni
Alumni of King's College London
Pakistani flying aces
Pakistan International Airlines people
Pakistan Air Force air marshals
1941 births